Cryptaulax may refer to:
 Cryptaulax (cryptomonad), a genus of Cryptomonadales in the family Cryptomonadaceae
 †Cryptaulax (gastropod), (†Cryptaulax Tate, 1869), the type genus of the subfamily Cryptaulacinae, when considered valid, otherwise an extinct genus in the family Procerithiidae and subfamily Procerithiinae
 Cryptaulax (wasp) (Cryptaulax Camoron, 1906), a genus of wasps in the subfamily Gelinae